"Every Time I Close My Eyes" is the fifth and final single from Australian recording artist Vanessa Amorosi's debut album, The Power (2000). In Australia, it was released as a double A-side single with "The Power" in December 2000 and peaked at number eight on the ARIA Singles Chart. The following year, "Every Time I Close My Eyes" was released in Japan and Europe, reaching the top 40 in Austria and Germany.

Track listings
Australian CD single
 "The Power" (single version) – 3:26
 "Every Time I Close My Eyes" (single version) – 3:45
 "The Power" (album version) – 3:26
 "The Power" (Spiced Mix) – 3:26
 "Absolutely Everybody" (UK club video clip)

Japanese CD single
 "Every Time I Close My Eyes" (album version)
 "Every Time I Close My Eyes" (single version)
 "Absolutely Everybody" (Millennium version)

European CD single
 "Every Time I Close My Eyes" (single version)
 "Turn to Me"
 "By Your Side"
 "Every Time I Close My Eyes" (album version)

Charts

Weekly chart

Year-end charts

Certifications

Release history

References

2000 songs
2001 singles
Songs written by Mark Holden
Songs written by Paul Wiltshire
Songs written by Vanessa Amorosi
Universal Records singles
Vanessa Amorosi songs